Bakhtolovo is a rural locality (a village) in Paustovskoye Rural Settlement, Vyaznikovsky District, Vladimir Oblast, Russia. The population was 8 as of 2010.

Geography 
Bakhtolovo is located on the Indrus River, 36 km south of Vyazniki (the district's administrative centre) by road. Prigorevo is the nearest rural locality.

References 

Rural localities in Vyaznikovsky District